Men's Super-G events at the 2006 Winter Paralympics were contested at Sestriere on 13—14 March.

There were 3 events. Each was contested by skiers from a range of disability classes, and the standings were decided by applying a disability factor to the actual times achieved.

Visually impaired

The visually impaired event took place on 14 March. It was won by Gianmaria Dal Maistro, representing .

Sitting

The sitting event took place on 14 March. It was won by Martin Braxenthaler, representing .

Standing

The standing event took place on 13 March. It was won by Walter Lackner, representing .

References

M